Mazunina is a rural locality (a village) in Leninskoye Rural Settlement, Kudymkarsky District, Perm Krai, Russia. The population was 13 as of 2010.

Geography 
Mazunina is located 39 km south of Kudymkar (the district's administrative centre) by road. Podgora is the nearest rural locality.

References 

Rural localities in Kudymkarsky District